Finky Pasamba (born 28 April 1993) is an Indonesian professional footballer who plays as a defensive midfielder for Liga 1 club RANS Nusantara.

Club career

PS Mojokerto Putra
In 2017, Finky Pasamba signed a contract with Indonesian Liga 2 club PS Mojokerto Putra.

Borneo F.C. Samarinda
He was signed for Borneo to play in Liga 1 in the 2019 season. Pasamba made his league debut on 16 May 2019 in a match against Bhayangkara at the Segiri Stadium, Samarinda.

PSIS Semarang
In middle season 2019, Finky Pasamba signed a year contract with PSIS Semarang. He made his league debut on 11 September 2019 in a match against PSM Makassar at the Andi Mattalatta Stadium, Makassar.

Bhayangkara F.C.
Pasamba was signed for Bhayangkara to play in Liga 1 in the 2022–23 season. He made his league debut on 31 July 2022 in a match against Persik Kediri at the Brawijaya Stadium, Kediri.

RANS Nusantara F.C.
Finky Pasamba became RANS Nusantara in half of the 2022–23 Liga 1. Finky made his debut on 16 January 2023 in a match against PSIS Semarang at the Pakansari Stadium, Cibinong.

International career
In 2007, Finky Pasamba represented the Indonesia U-16, in the 2008 AFC U-16 Championship qualification.

Career statistics

Club

References

External links 
 Finky Pasamba at Soccerway
 Finky Pasamba at Liga Indonesia

1993 births
Living people
Sportspeople from Maluku (province)
Indonesian footballers
Association football midfielders
Liga 1 (Indonesia) players
Liga 2 (Indonesia) players
PSIS Semarang players
Borneo F.C. players
PS Mojokerto Putra players
Bhayangkara F.C. players
RANS Nusantara F.C. players
People from Ambon, Maluku
Indonesia youth international footballers